Love & Hate is the debut studio album of South Korean singer Hyolyn (leader of Sistar). The album was released on November 26, 2013 and reached number 5 on South Korea's Gaon Album Chart.

Release and singles
On November 20, 2013, Hyolyn unveiled the track list for her debut solo album. As shown in the track list, the album consists of a total of 10 tracks by producers Brave Brothers, Duble Sidekick, Kim Do Hoon, and more. Hyolyn also collaborated with artists Mad Clown, Dok2, and Block B's Zico. Hyolyn released two lead singles, "Lonely" and "One Way Love".  Love and Hate consists of tracks produced by some of K-pop's hit producers, including Brave Brothers, Kim Do Hoon and Brave Brothers The album was released on November 26, 2013, and reached a position of number 5 on the Gaon Weekly Albums Chart.

Hyolyn uses a whispery voice for this song and explores the streets of London in the music video. Its music video and digital single were released on November 25, 2013.  The song reached number 3 on the Gaon Digital Singles Chart.

The lead single "One Way Love", produced by Brave Brothers, is a "hip-hop style R&B" song with a "touch of tango beat". The second single, "Lonely", produced by Kim Da Hoon, is a British retro-pop song with piano and acoustic guitar. The album also features Korean rappers such as Mad Clown, Block B's Zico, Dok2 and Geek's Lil' Boy.On November 26, Hyolyn held a successful media showcase in celebration of the release of her solo album at Seoul Ilchi Art Hall. The video features actor Yoo Yeon-seok as the male lead. The track reached number 1 on the Gaon Digital Singles Chart.

Hyolyn held the album's showcase performance at the Ilchi Art Hall in Cheongdam-dong, Gangnam-Gu, Seoul on November 26, 2013. She performed songs from her solo debut album and held a showcase on Mnet, performing Sistar's songs with the members as well as her own tracks from her album. Only top stars such as BoA, Lee Hyori and Rain have been given this honor by Mnet.

Track listing

Chart performance

Sales and certifications

References

External links
 
 

2013 debut albums
Kakao M albums
Korean-language albums
Sistar albums
Starship Entertainment albums